Pablo Ezequiel Fontanello (born 26 September 1984) is an Argentine footballer who plays for Spanish club Toledo in the fifth-tier Tercera Federación.

Career
New player GNK Dinamo
Emerged from the lower Deportivo Español, the Argentine player debuted at the club in 2003 and was there until 2006. In 2006, he moved to Tigre. In 2007, he signed for Santiago Wanderers. In 2008, he was repatriated back to Tigre

In 2009, Fontanello transferred to Parma, but returned on loan to Tigre in January 2010. In July 2010, the Argentine defender was loaned again, this time to Gimnasia y Esgrima La Plata.

In August 2011, Fontanello was loaned to Chornomorets Odessa until the end of the season.

At the start of March 2014, Fontanello left Chornomorets Odesa due to the civil unrest caused by the 2014 Ukrainian revolution, going on to sign for Stabæk in Norway at the end of the transfer window. After spending three months in Norway, Fontanello moved to Russian Premier League side Ural in June 2014. On 19 October 2014, he scored his first goal for Ural against Spartak Moscow in a 2-0 win.

In March 2017, Fontanello signed for Ordabasy in the Kazakhstan Premier League. On 4 August 2021, Fontanello left Ordabasy by mutual consent.

Career statistics

Club

References

External links
 Statistics at Irish Times
 Profile at goal.com
 Argentine Primera statistics at Fútbol XXI 

1984 births
People from Lincoln Partido
Sportspeople from Buenos Aires Province
Living people
Argentine footballers
Association football central defenders
Deportivo Español footballers
Club Atlético Tigre footballers
Santiago Wanderers footballers
Parma Calcio 1913 players
Club de Gimnasia y Esgrima La Plata footballers
FC Chornomorets Odesa players
Stabæk Fotball players
FC Ural Yekaterinburg players
FC Ordabasy players
CD Toledo players
Argentine Primera División players
Serie A players
Ukrainian Premier League players
Eliteserien players
Russian Premier League players
Kazakhstan Premier League players
Tercera Federación players
Argentine expatriate footballers
Expatriate footballers in Chile
Argentine expatriate sportspeople in Chile
Expatriate footballers in Italy
Argentine expatriate sportspeople in Italy
Expatriate footballers in Ukraine
Argentine expatriate sportspeople in Ukraine
Expatriate footballers in Norway
Argentine expatriate sportspeople in Norway
Expatriate footballers in Russia
Argentine expatriate sportspeople in Russia
Expatriate footballers in Kazakhstan
Argentine expatriate sportspeople in Kazakhstan
Expatriate footballers in Spain
Argentine expatriate sportspeople in Spain